The Underground Railroad is an American historical drama streaming television limited series created and directed by Barry Jenkins based on the 2016 novel of the same name by Colson Whitehead. The series premiered on Amazon Prime Video on May 14, 2021.

The series won the Golden Globe Award for Best Miniseries or Television Film, the BAFTA for Best International Programme, received a Peabody Award, and garnered several other nominations including the Primetime Emmy Award for Outstanding Limited or Anthology Series.

Premise
A fictional story of people attempting an escape from slavery in the southern United States in the 1800s utilizing a key plot element that employs the literary style of magic realism. In reality, "The Underground Railroad" was a network of abolitionists, hidden routes, and safe houses that helped enslaved African-Americans escape to freedom in the early to mid-1800s. In the novel and the series, it is an actual railroad complete with engineers, conductors, tracks, and tunnels. Cora, an enslaved woman from Georgia, joins newcomer Caesar to ride the subterranean train to freedom.

Cast

Main
 Thuso Mbedu as Cora Randall
 Chase W. Dillon as Homer, Ridgeway's assistant
 Joel Edgerton as Arnold Ridgeway, a slave catcher
 Fred Hechinger as Young Arnold Ridgeway
 Peter Mullan as Ridgeway Senior, father of Arnold Ridgeway
 Mychal-Bella Bowman as Fanny Briggs/Grace
 Sheila Atim as Mabel

Recurring
 Aaron Pierre as Caesar Garner
William Jackson Harper as Royal
 Lily Rabe as Ethel Wells
 Chukwudi Iwuji as Mingo
 Calvin Leon Smith as Jasper
 Damon Herriman as Martin Wells
 Amber Gray as Gloria Valentine
 Benjamin Walker as Terrance Randall
Justice Leak as James Randall
 Lucius Baston as Prideful
 Owen Harn as Chandler
 Bri Collins as Olivia
 Ryan James as Red
 Will Poulter as Sam
 Peter de Jersey as John Valentine
 IronE Singleton as Mack
 Marcus "MJ" Gladney Jr. as Ellis
 Cullen Moss as Judge Smith
 Jim Klock as Tom Hardman

Episodes

Production

Development
On September 16, 2016, it was announced that Barry Jenkins was set to adapt Colson Whitehead's novel The Underground Railroad into a limited series. Jenkins was expected to produce the series alongside Adele Romanski. Production companies involved with the series were set to include Plan B Entertainment. On March 27, 2017, it was reported that Amazon Video had given the production a script-to-series commitment. On June 5, 2018, it was announced that Amazon given the production a formal greenlight and that Jenkins would direct all eleven episodes of the series. In June 2019, Nicholas Britell announced he would serve as composer on the series.

Casting
In April 2019, Thuso Mbedu, Chase W. Dillon, Aaron Pierre and Joel Edgerton joined the cast of the series. In August 2019, Damon Herriman and William Jackson Harper joined the cast of the series in recurring roles. In September 2019, Lucius Baston joined the cast of the series in a recurring role. In October 2019, Amber Gray joined the cast of the series in a recurring role. In November 2019, Jim Klock joined the cast of the series in a recurring role. In January 2020, Lily Rabe joined the cast of the series in a recurring role. In February 2020, Fred Hechinger and the rest of the cast was announced.

Filming
Filming began in August 2019 in Savannah, Georgia, and production lasted 116 days before concluding on September 22, 2020.

Release
The Underground Railroad was released on Amazon Prime Video on May 14, 2021.

Reception

Critical response
Review aggregator Rotten Tomatoes reported an approval rating of 94% based on 106 critic reviews, with an average rating of 8.9/10. The website's critics consensus reads, "With a superb ensemble and Barry Jenkins' singular eye, The Underground Railroad delicately translates its source material into a powerfully humane series that is as challenging as it is necessary." Metacritic gave the series a weighted average score of 92 out of 100 based on 37 critic reviews, indicating "universal acclaim".

Reviewing the series for Rolling Stone, Alan Sepinwall gave a rating of 4/5 and described the series as "an imperfect take on a painful, sprawling subject. But its emotional highs and lows are stronger than anything you are likely to find on TV this year, just as those images are more gorgeous and nightmarish." Stephen Robinson of The A.V. Club gave the series an A and said, "Jenkins has assembled an amazing cast, including William Jackson Harper as Cora's love interest, Royal, and Lily Rabe, who chills the screen as Ethel, the wife of a North Carolina abolitionist (Damon Herriman)."

Accolades

See also
 Underground (TV series)
 List of films featuring slavery

References

Notes

External links
 
 
 

2021 American television series debuts
2021 American television series endings
2020s American drama television miniseries
English-language television shows
Amazon Prime Video original programming
Magic realism television series
Television shows based on American novels
Television series by Amazon Studios
Television shows filmed in Georgia (U.S. state)
Television series set in the 19th century
Works about American slavery
Works about the Underground Railroad